Nick Whitaker (born October 1, 1988) is an American actor who is known for playing the lead role in Benji: Off the Leash!.

Career
Whitaker's first role was a Chase Patterson in Message in a Cell Phone. He is an active member of the Church of Jesus Christ of Latter-day Saints and has appeared in many church related movies which include starring as Joseph Smith in the major film from the LDS Motion Picture Studios, Joseph Smith: The Prophet of the Restoration, which is currently playing at the Joseph Smith Memorial Building and various visitor centres across the world.  He has also appeared in Brigham City, Money or The Mission, and the children's film Bug Off.

Whitaker has also appeared in the Disney Channel movies High School Musical and Read It and Weep, and he had a minor role as one of the basketball players in Hatching Pete.

In Read It and Weep he plays Lenny Bartlett, the older brother of Jamie Bartlett, who is the main character.  In the movie he sings the song "I Will Be Around".

Filmography

References

External links

Official web Site

Living people
1988 births
American male child actors
American Latter Day Saints
American male film actors
American male television actors
21st-century American male actors
21st-century American singers
21st-century American male singers